The 2010 New Zealand Music Awards was the 45th holding of the annual ceremony featuring awards for musical artists based in or originating from New Zealand. Finalists for the three technical awards were announced on 16 August 2010 with winners announced on 1 September, the date on which finalists for 16 'non-technical' categories were revealed. Five 'non-technical' awards were presented without a group of finalists being selected. The awards ceremony took place on 7 October 2010 at Vector Arena, Auckland. Hosted by television presenter Shannon Ryan and comedian Ben Hurley, the ceremony was broadcast on television channel C4. Various musicians, most of whom had been nominated for awards, performed songs on the awards night.

Gin Wigmore and Dane Rumble each received six nominations, while The Phoenix Foundation received eight nominations, including three in technical categories. Wigmore's album Holy Smoke won three of the categories in which it was nominated, including Album of the Year, as well as the award for the highest selling New Zealand album. New Zealand-born Australian Idol winner Stan Walker won the People's Choice Award, as well as three awards featuring no finalists. "Just a Little Bit" by Kids of 88 was awarded the title of Single of the Year. Shihad won the Legacy Award, and were inducted into the New Zealand Music Hall of Fame.

Nominees and winners 
Winners are listed first and highlighted in boldface.
Key
 – Non-technical award
 – Technical award

Presenters and performers

Presenters 

Presenters of awards at the ceremony:

 Irish Boyzone singer Ronan Keating and New Zealand pop musician Brooke Fraser presented the awards for Album of the Year and Single of the Year.
 Actress Rose McIver and musician Liam Finn presented the awards for Best Group, Best Male Solo Artist and Best Female Solo Artist.
 Actress Robyn Malcolm and songwriter Don McGlashan presented the awards for Best Pop Album, Best Rock Album and Breakthrough Artist of The Year.
 Newsreader Sam Hayes and footballers Winston Reid and Tim Brown presented the awards for Best Urban / Hip Hop Album, Best Aotearoa Roots Album and Best Electronica Album.
 Entertainment reporter Kate Rodger presented the award for Best Music Video.
 Film and television producer Dave Gisbon presented the awards for Gospel / Christian Album and Best Classical Album.
 Rugby league players Lance Hohaia and Micheal Luck and the Vodafone 'Voice of the People' winner presented the People's Choice Award.

Performers 
Performers at the ceremony:
 Dane Rumble, Stan Walker and J.Williams sang an 'Illegal mashup', a medley which included parts of "Choose You", "You Got Me", "Black Box", "Everything (Take Me Down)" and "Takes Me Higher".
 Pop singer Anika Moa sang "Running Through the Fire (Storm)", the lead single from her album, accompanied by Julia Deans.
 David Dallas performed his song "Til Tomorrow".
 "Buffalo" was given by indie rock band The Phoenix Foundation.
 Pop duo Kids of 88 played their award-winning single "Just a Little Bit".
 Gin Wigmore gave her number, "Oh My".
 'Luger Boa and friends' sang a Shihad tribute.

Notes

References

External links 
 Official New Zealand Music Awards website

New Zealand Music Awards, 2010
New Zealand Music Awards, 2010
Aotearoa Music Awards
October 2010 events in New Zealand